New Hanover County Arboretum - NC Cooperative Extension is a 7-acre arboretum at 6206 Oleander Drive, Wilmington, North Carolina. It is open daily without charge.

The arboretum was formally opened in 1989, and is still under development. It currently contains 33 gardens including an aquatic garden, children's garden, herb garden, Japanese garden, and rose garden. It is said to contain more than 4,000 varieties of native and naturalized plants, with many of its original plants given by J. C. Raulston, North Carolina State University horticulturist and namesake for the JC Raulston Arboretum.

Gallery

See also 
 List of botanical gardens in the United States

External links 

 NC Cooperative Extension - New Hanover County Arboretum

Arboreta in North Carolina
Botanical gardens in North Carolina
Protected areas of New Hanover County, North Carolina